Ensconsin is a protein that in humans is encoded by the MAP7 gene.

Function 

The product of this gene is a microtubule-associated protein that is predominantly expressed in cells of epithelial origin. Microtubule-associated proteins are thought to be involved in microtubule dynamics, which is essential for cell polarization and differentiation. This protein has been shown to be able to stabilize microtubules, and may serve to modulate microtubule functions. Studies of the related mouse protein also suggested an essential role in microtubule function required for spermatogenesis.

In addition, MAPs also play a role in regulating cellular transport. MAP7 is a necessary cofactor to activate and subsequently transport cargos by Kinesin-1.   

MAP7's effect on Dynein is still debated.

Interactions 

MAP7 has been shown to interact with TRPV4.

References

Further reading